AutoTester was a company in the software test automation market founded by siblings Randy and Linda Hayes.  Their previous company was called the Software Recording Corporation of America (SRCA) with AutoMentor and AutoTester as their flagship products.  The company claims to have produced the first commercial test tool for the PC (see references section). Founded in 1985, it was based in Dallas, Texas and achieved $14 million annual revenue by 1996, but revenues began declining after that. As of June, 2007 or earlier, AutoTester's phone was disconnected and their web site was taken offline in July 2007.

Products developed by AutoTester include:

 AutoTester
 AutoTester ONE
 AutoController

Clients of AutoTester include:

 Boeing
 Coca-Cola's
 CIBC
 Aegon
 Shell Oil
 MetLife
 Allstate
 Northop Grumman
 Procter & Gamble
 Pratt and Whitney Canada
 IBM
 Motorola
 Air Canada
 Hewlett Packard
 Tandem Computers
 Compaq

See also

 Worksoft
 CapCal
 Mercury Interactive Corporation
 Compuware
 Borland Software

References

https://www.slideshare.net/Bugler/test-automation-past-present-and-future  - see page 8
http://www.testingreferences.com/testinghistory.php   - see 1985
https://www.linkedin.com/in/keizo-tatsumi-71467841/detail/overlay-view/urn:li:fsd_profileTreasuryMedia:(ACoAAAjRyQABmPUWFO7aky_zUDVUGWiM5lnxB6A,50496025)/  (see 1980s slide)

1985 establishments in Texas
2007 disestablishments in Texas
Companies based in Dallas
Software companies established in 1985
Software companies disestablished in 2007
Defunct software companies of the United States